Fougasse may refer to:

Fougasse (cartoonist) (1887–1965), pen name of Cyril Kenneth Bird, cartoonist and editor of Punch 1949–53
Fougasse (weapon)
Flame fougasse
Fougasse (bread)

see also Focaccia